Thevur is a Town Panchayat city in Salem district, Tamil Nadu. 

The city is divided into 15 wards for which elections are held every 5 years.

Population
The Thevur Town Panchayat has population of 8,548 of which 4,415 are males while 4,133 are females as per report released by Census India 2011.

Population of children with age of 0-6 is 727 which is 8.50% of total population of Thevur (TP). In Thevur Town Panchayat, female sex ratio is of 936 against state average of 996. Moreover, the child sex ratio in Thevur is around 855 compared to Tamil Nadu state average of 943. The literacy rate of Thevur city is 65.80%, lower than the state average of 80.09%. In Thevur, male literacy is around 76.66% while female literacy rate is 54.29%.

Thevur Town Panchayat has total administration over 2,423 houses to which it supplies basic amenities like water and sewerage. It is also authorized to build roads within Town Panchayat limits and impose taxes on properties coming under its jurisdiction.

Work profile
Out of total population, 5,051 were engaged in work or business activity. Of this 2,869 were males while 2,182 were females. In the census survey, a worker is defined as a person who does business, job, service, or cultivator and labour activity. Of total 5,051 working population, 89.94% were engaged in Main Work while 10.06% of total workers were engaged in Marginal Work.

Religion data 2011
 Town	Population  Hindu  Muslim  Christian	Sikh	Buddhist Jain	Others	Not Stated
 Thevur	8,548      96.36%  0.13%   3.45%	0.01%	0.00%	0.00%	0.00%	0.05%

Caste factor
Schedule Caste (SC) constitutes 22.15% while Schedule Tribe (ST) were 0.04% of total population in Thevur (TP).

References

http://www.census2011.co.in/data/town/803460-thevur-tamil-nadu.html

Cities and towns in Salem district